The Camel's Dance is a black and white Chinese animation made in 1935 by three of the Wan brothers.  It is considered the first animation with sound in China.

History
The segment is believed to be a technological showcasing of sound from an animation clip. It is unknown if the sound was just music or actual words spoken. The title can also be translated as "Camel Presenting a Dance".

See also
History of Chinese Animation
Chinese Animation

References

External links
 China Movie DB

1935 films
1930s animated short films
Chinese animated short films
Chinese black-and-white films
1935 animated films